Nunan (and ) is an Irish surname. Notable people with the surname include:

Mick Nunan (born 1949), former Australian rules football player 
David Nunan (born 1949), Australian linguist
Joseph Nunan (1842–1885), Irish born patriot and builder
Paul Nunan (1858–1934), Australian educationalist
Sheila Nunan, General Secretary of the Irish National Teachers' Organisation
Joseph D. Nunan, Jr. (1897–1968), American politician

See also
Noonan

Surnames of Irish origin
Anglicised Irish-language surnames